Operation Valuable, also known as the Albanian subversion or Secret Anglo-American invasion of communist Albania, was one of the earliest covert paramilitary operations in the Eastern Bloc. The main goal of the operation was to overthrow the government of communist Albania.

MI6 and the CIA launched a joint subversive operation, using Albanian expatriates as agents. Other anti-communist Albanians and many nationalists worked as agents for Yugoslav, Greek and Italian intelligence services, some supported by the Anglo-American secret services. A Soviet mole, and, later, other spies tipped off the missions to Moscow, which in turn relayed the information to Albania. Consequently, many of the agents were caught, put on trial, and either shot or condemned to long prison terms at Penal labour. 

The operation resulted in many deaths and was one of the most carefully concealed secrets of the Cold War. In 2006, some 2,300 pages of documents laying out major parts of the Albania Project under its two major cryptonyms, BGFIEND and OBOPUS, were declassified by a U.S. government interagency working group acting under the terms of the Nazi War Crimes Disclosure Act.

Background
The reason behind Operation Valuable was that Albania was separated from the rest of the Soviet Bloc by Yugoslavia, which had split with the Soviet Union in June 1948. Albania was also the poorest European nation, and was home to about one million people, many still divided along semi-feudal and (especially in remote areas) tribal lines. In addition to its  three major religious groups, there were two distinct socio-economic classes: people owning land (and especially those claiming feudal privileges), and the remainder. The landowners constituted about 1% of the population but held 95% of the cultivated land; in the country's central and southern regions, they also held the principal ruling posts.

During World War II, the Albanian society was split into several amorphous groups: nationalists, communists, royalists, traditionalists – the latter both tribal and feudal in nature. It was the Communist-led National Liberation Front that emerged victorious, mainly due to the ideological discipline instilled in their troops, but also because they were the only force which had consistently fought the Italians and Germans; many nationalists and the royalists had collaborated with Italian or German occupiers during the war.

However, Albania was in an unenviable position after World War II. Greece hungered for Albanian lands it claimed, while Yugoslavia wanted Albania merged into a Balkan confederation. The Western Allies recognized neither King Zog nor a republican government-in-exile, nor did they ever raise the question of Albania or its borders at major wartime conferences. No reliable statistics on Albania's wartime losses exist, but the United Nations Relief and Rehabilitation Administration reported about 30,000 Albanian dead from the war, 200 destroyed villages, 18,000 destroyed houses, and about 100,000 people made homeless, numbers whose significance is further compounded by the relatively small population of Albania: approximately 1,000,000 in 1938. Albanian official statistics claim somewhat higher losses.

Operational plans

In this post-war chaos of 1949 the allies decided to launch their operation. The plan called for parachute drops of royalists into the Mati region in Central Albania. The region was traditionally known as a bastion of Albanian traditionalism and moreover praised for their loyalty to King Zog, himself an offspring of one of the regional clans. The original plan was that, if the British government could parachute in enough well-trained agents, they could organize a massive popular revolt, which the allies would supply by air drops. In time, this revolt would spill out a civil war. The trouble that this would cause the Soviet politics was considered by the British to be worth the risk, and if it did succeed, then it could be the starting point of a chain reaction of counter-revolutions throughout the Eastern Bloc. The project appeared so appealing that the Secret Intelligence Service (SIS) had no hesitation in putting it into operation. It was run in detail by an agent who had come into SIS and Special Operations Executive (SOE). The chief of SIS, Stewart Menzies, was not enthusiastic about the paramilitary operation but saw it as a way to appease the former SOE “stinks and bangs people.”

In addition, the British wanted the United States to finance the operation and to provide bases. Senior British intelligence officer William Hayter, who chaired the Joint Intelligence Committee (JIC), came to Washington, D.C. in March with a group of Secret Intelligence Service members and Foreign Office staff that included Gladwyn Jebb, Earl Jellicoe, and Peter Dwyer of SIS and a Balkans specialist. Joined by SIS Washington liaison Kim Philby, they met with Robert Joyce of the US State Department’s Policy and Planning Staff (PPS) and Frank Wisner, who was the head of the Office of Policy Coordination (OPC), and other U.S. intelligence officials such as James McCargar and Franklin Lindsay. McCargar was assigned to liaise with Philby on joint operational matters.  Unbeknownst to the SIS and CIA, though, Philby was a communist, and spy for Soviet foreign intelligence.

There was no scarcity of anti-communist Albanians and the recruiters promptly found them in the Displaced Persons camps in Greece, Italy, and Turkey. The manpower recruitment for what the British codenamed VALUABLE Project and the Americans FIEND, consisted of 40% from the Balli Kombëtar (BK) National Front, a fascist collaborationist organization formed during World War II, 40% from the monarchist movement, known as Legaliteti and the rest from other Albanian factions.

Valuable Project/Fiend  

A dozen Albanian émigrés were recruited and taken to Libya to train for a pilot project that would become known as Operation Valuable (It is not clear exactly when MI6 assigned the VALUABLE cryptonym to the Albanian effort). The SIS, with U.S. Army Col. 'Ace' Miller as a liaison, trained these men in the use of weapons, codes and radio, the techniques of subversion and sabotage. They were dropped into the mountains of Mati throughout 1947, but failed to impress the inhabitants of the region into a larger revolt. The operation dragged on until 1949. There were sabotage attempts on the Kuçova oilfields and the copper mines in Rubik but no real success in raising a revolt. Then, the US government weighing up the political situation, decided to lend a hand. In September 1949, British foreign secretary Ernest Bevin went to Washington, D.C. to discuss Operation Valuable with US government officials. The CIA released a report that concluded that “a purely internal Albanian uprising at this time is not indicated, and, if undertaken, would have little chance of success.” The CIA asserted that the Enver Hoxha regime had a 65,000 man regular army and a security force of 15,000. There were intelligence reports that there were 1,500 Soviet “advisers” and 4,000 “technicians” in Albania helping to train the Albanian Army.

British and U.S. naval officials were concerned that the USSR was building a submarine base at the Karaburun Peninsula near the port of Vlora. On 6 September 1949, when NATO met for the first time in Washington, Bevin proposed that “a counter-revolution” be launched in Albania. US Secretary of State Dean Acheson was in agreement. NATO, established as a defensive military alliance for Western Europe and North America, was now committed to launching offensive covert operations against a sovereign nation in the Balkans. The US and UK, joining with their weak allies, Italy and Greece, agreed to support the overthrow of the Hoxha regime in Albania and to eliminate Soviet influence in the Mediterranean region. Bevin wanted to place King Zog on the throne as the leader of Albania once Hoxha was overthrown.

This time a better class of commandos was sought so an approach was made to King Zog in exile in Cairo to recommend men for the job. But British negotiator Neil 'Billy' McLean and American representatives Robert Miner and Robert Low were unable to bring Zog in because no one would name him head of a provisional government in exile. In August 1949, an announcement was made in Paris that Albanian political exiles had formed a multiparty committee to foment anticommunist rebellion in the homeland; actually the "Free Albania" National Committee was created by American diplomatic and intelligence officials for political cover to a covert paramilitary project, with British concurrence. The British made the first organizational move, hiring on as chief trainer Major David Smiley, deputy commander of a cavalry (tank) regiment stationed in Germany. The leaders of the Balli Kombetar, an exile political group whose key policy was to replace the Albanian Communist regime with a non-royalist government, had already agreed with McLean and his cohort, Julian Amery, to supply 30 Albanian emigres as recruits for the operation to penetrate Albania.

In July 1949, the first group of 30 Albanian recruits, some veterans of World War II guerrilla and civil wars, were recruited by Balli Kombetar leaders and transported by British special operations personnel to Fort Binġemma, on the British crown colony of Malta.  Labeled as "The Pixies" by the SIS, the Pixies spent two months training as radio operators, intelligence gatherers, and more sophisticated guerrillas than they had been as members of cetas (guerrilla bands) during World War II. On 26 September 1949, nine Pixies boarded a Royal Navy trawler which sailed north; three days later, a Greek style fishing boat, known as a caïque and named "Stormie Seas', sailed from Malta.

In the following years 1948 and 1950 there were many armed conflicts between Albanian and Yugoslav soldiers in the Albanian-Yugoslav borders, when Yugoslavs wanted to send their agent soldiers in the border of Albania, the Yugoslav soldiers were all caught or even killed.

With a stop at an Italian port, the two vessels sailed 3 October, rendezvoused at a point in the Adriatic Sea, and transferred the Albanians to the caïque. Hours later that same night, the Pixies landed on the Albanian coast, some distance south of Vlora, which was the former territory of the Balli Kombetar, others further north. This was the start of Operation Valuable. Albanian government security forces soon interdicted one of the two groups into which the commandos had split. The Communists killed three members of the first group, and a fourth man with the second group. The first three deaths and disappearance of a fourth man to join his family wiped out one group, while the surviving four from the first 1949 covert landing exfiltrated south to Greece.

For two years after this landing, small groups of British-trained Albanians left every so often from training camps in Malta and Britain and West Germany. Most of the operations were a disaster, with Albanian security forces interdicting many of the insurgents. Occasionally, the Albanian authorities would report on “large but unsuccessful infiltrations of enemies of the people” in several regions of the country. It must also be pointed out that some British, Italian, and Greek agents infiltrated Albania two, three, and four times each, a pattern that followed Albanian exiles who worked as intelligence gatherers for the Italian Navy. Some American agents, originally trained by Italian or Greek officials, also infiltrated by air, sea, or on foot on more than two occasions, to gather intelligence rather than take part in political or paramilitary operations. The most successful of these operatives was Hamit Marjani, code name Tiger, who partook in 15 land incursions.

The last infiltration took place a few weeks before Easter 1952. In a desperate effort to discover what was going on Captain Shehu himself, with Captain Branica and radio operator Tahir Prenci, were guided by veteran gendarme and guerrilla fighter Matjani and three armed guards to the Mati region northeast of Tirana, the region once home to Albania's ex-King Zog. Albanian security forces militia were waiting for them at their rendezvous point, a house owned by Shehu's cousin, a known supporter of Zog. The militia forced Shehu's operator to transmit an all clear signal to his base in Cyprus. The operator had been schooled to deal with such situations  by using a fail-safe drill which involved broadcasting in a way that warned it was being sent under duress and therefore should be disregarded. But the militia seemed to know the drill. The all clear signal went out and, nearly a year later, four more top agents, including Matjani himself, parachuted into an ambush at Shen Gjergj (Saint George), near the town of Elbasan. The Albanian army was waiting in a big circle, guns cocked, and the guerrillas landed in the middle of it. No one surrendered. Those not killed were tried in April 1954.

In a 2009 episode of the RTÉ television programme "Who Do You Think You Are?", Colonel Charles Davison's wife Maeve (née de Burgh - mother of Chris de Burgh) reveals that Davison was posted to Malta in the early 1950s.  When asked what the posting involved, Maeve replies "He was offered a posting in Malta. It was officially Army work but in fact it was intelligence work. He was training agents to be put into Albania. And he was teaching them how to... blow things up and generally cause lots of destruction."
 
Mrs. Davison wrote a letter on 21 May 1952 telling the Army that Col Davison was no longer interested in a job he had been inquiring about because he had already left for another posting.  The letter is contained in Davison's official war records and was shown on the programme. The location of the posting is not stated in the letter but when questioned about where it was, Maeve Davison confirms it was Malta. Maeve Davison says she joined her husband in Malta and acted as a cypher clerk - encoding and decoding messages about the operations and forwarding them to London. Her letter and comments on the programme indicate the MI6 operation did not cease but continued on Malta in 1952 and later under Colonel Charles Davison.

Aftermath

Shehu, Sufa, Matjani and others were put on trial, which found all guilty as charged. Shehu, Sula and the royal guards were to be shot, Matjani to be hanged.  Many of the local inhabitants who were suspected of having helped the guerrillas, were jailed or forcibly located elsewhere in Albania. Whatever remained of the anticommunist resistance was virtually erased.

Up to 300 agents and civilians who helped them were likely killed during the operation. Abaz Ermenji, co-founder of Balli Kombetar (BK) stated: “Our ‘allies’ wanted to make use of Albania as a guinea-pig, without caring about the human losses, for an absurd enterprise that was condemned to failure.”  Halil Nerguti stated: “We were used as an experiment. We were a small part of a big game, pawns that could be sacrificed.” There is no question that the CIA and MI6 used the operation as a small-scale exercise in regime change. The stakes were small. Failure would not be noticed. John H. Richardson Sr, Director of the CIA's South-East Division, terminated Operation Fiend. By 1954, Company 4000's 120 members focused on guarding a United States Air Force chemical weapons dump south of Munich; CIA training facilities outside Heidelberg, West Germany shut down, as did a CIA base on a Greek island. Over time, the remaining Albanians were resettled in the UK, US and Commonwealth countries.

During the summer of 1993, one of the ex-American agents, Shaqir Kabashi, an ethnic Albanian from Kosovo, travelled to Albania in hopes of finding the remains of his brother. He believed his brother had been shot to death during a 1951 covert operation for the U.S. OPC. The story Kabashi had been told by an Albanian newly emigrated to the U.S. was that remains of CIA agents were buried on a hillside near the city of Fier. Using some of his retirement money, Kabashi recruited a gang of men from a nearby village, who dug several pits in a hillside meadow. Human remains were found in one pit, Kabashi later told a Reuters reporter. Believing he had his brother's remains, Shaqir had most of the skeletons buried in a courtyard of a nearby mosque. He carried a few samples of bones on his flight back to the U.S. Despite suggestions that he seek U.S. Government aid in getting DNA analysis, Shaqir died in November 1997 without confirming he had found his late brother.

See also
 Banda Mustafaj
 Anti-Communism
Bay of Pigs invasion – similar operation in Cuba

References

Sources 
 
 
 Colonel David Smiley LVO, OBE, MC, "Irregular Regular", Michael Russell, Norwich, 1994. The Mémoirs of a Royal Horse Guards officer, SOE agent in Albania and Thailand, and later MI6 agent in Poland, Malta, Oman and Yemen. He trained the Pixies in Malta in 1949. Translated in French by Thierry Le Breton, Au cœur de l’action clandestine. Des Commandos au MI6, L’Esprit du Livre Editions, France, 2008. With numerous photographs.
 Dorril, Stephen. MI6: Fifty Years of Special Operations, Fourth Estate, University of Michigan: 2000
 
 
 Noble, Andrew. “Bullets and Broadcasting: Methods of Subversion and Subterfuge in the CIA War against the Iron Curtain.” MA dissert. University of Nevada, 2009
 Stavrou, Nikolaos A. “Searching for a Brother Lost in Albania’s Gulag”. Mediterranean Quarterly 19, no. 2 (2008): 47-81

Media
 "CIA and British MI6 in Albania"
 Irish television programme "Who Do You Think You Are? Episode: Rosanna Davison" Broadcast on RTÉ One, 28 September 2009. Contains the revelation that Rosanna Davison's grandfather Charles Davison took up a secret posting in Malta in 1952, training agents to infiltrate Albania.

Cold War history of Albania
Cold War intelligence operations
People's Socialist Republic of Albania
Covert organizations
Central Intelligence Agency operations
United Kingdom intelligence operations
Albania–Soviet Union relations
Albania–United Kingdom relations
20th century in Malta